Alton is a civil parish in the district of Staffordshire Moorlands, Staffordshire, England. It contains 63 listed buildings that are recorded in the National Heritage List for England. Of these, one is listed at Grade I, the highest of the three grades, six are at Grade II*, the middle grade, and the others are at Grade II, the lowest grade.  The parish contains the villages of Alton and Bradley in the Moors and the surrounding countryside.  Most of the listed buildings are houses and associated structures, cottages, farmhouses and farm buildings.  The River Churnet runs through the parish, and the listed buildings associated with it are a weir and two bridges.  The other listed buildings include churches and items in and around the churchyards, the ruins of a castle, public houses, a village lock-up, two mileplates, a well, a school, and a village pump.

Key

Buildings

References

Citations

Sources

Lists of listed buildings in Staffordshire